Silvered Water, Syria Self-Portrait is a Syrian documentary film about the Syrian Civil War, directed by Ossama Mohammed and Wiam Simav Bedirxan. The film premiered in the Special Screenings section of the 2014 Cannes Film Festival.

Shot by a reported “1,001 Syrians,” according to the filmmakers, Silvered Water, Syria Self-Portrait impressionistically documents the destruction and atrocities of the civil war through a combination of eye-witness accounts shot on mobile phones and posted to the internet, and footage shot by Bedirxan during the siege of Homs. Bedirxan, an elementary school teacher in Homs, had contacted Mohammed online to ask him what he would film, if he was there. Mohammed, working in forced exile in Paris, is tormented by feelings of cowardice as he witnesses the horrors from afar, and the self-reflexive film also chronicles how he is haunted in this dreams by a Syrian boy once shot to death for snatching his camera on the street.

The documentary includes some scenes of atrocities that Mohammed believes could only have been filmed by members of the Syrian government security forces. Mohammed and Bedirxan only met in person for the first time when she was able to escape Homs and attend the world premiere in France.

References

External links
 
 Cannes Film Festival webpage

2014 films
2014 documentary films
Syrian documentary films
2010s Arabic-language films
Documentary films about the Syrian civil war
Documentary films about citizen media
Self-reflexive films
Documentary films alleging war crimes
Films directed by Ossama Mohammed
Documentary films about the Internet
Homs